Desmond St. Lloyd Hazel (born 15 July 1967) is a former footballer who played at both professional and international levels as a left winger.

Playing career

Club career
Born in Bradford, Hazel played with the youth team of Sheffield Wednesday and made his senior debut for them in October 1986.

Hazel made a total of 274 appearances in the Football League for Sheffield Wednesday, Grimsby Town, Rotherham United and Chesterfield.

He later played in Australia for Joondalup City, and also went on trial with Perth Glory in August 1997.

After having issues with his visa, Hazel returned to England to play non-League football for Guiseley.

International career
Hazel represented Saint Kitts and Nevis at international football. He received his first call-up in March 1998, alongside a number of fellow English-born players - Andy Watson, Kevin Francis and Bobby Bowry. Hazel made his international debut in 2000, and earned four caps that year.

Coaching career
Hazel worked as the Head of Youth Development at FC Halifax Town. He was previously the head coach of the Halifax Town School of Excellence, before becoming their youth team coach in July 2006.

Hazel has also coached at Manchester City, Bradford City and Leeds United.

He later worked for Bradford (Park Avenue) as an academy coach from October 2019, leaving that role in May 2020.

Personal life
His son Jacob Hazel is a footballer who also played at professional level for Chesterfield.

References

1967 births
Living people
Citizens of Saint Kitts and Nevis through descent
Footballers from Bradford
English footballers
Saint Kitts and Nevis footballers
Saint Kitts and Nevis international footballers
Sheffield Wednesday F.C. players
Grimsby Town F.C. players
Rotherham United F.C. players
Chesterfield F.C. players
Perth RedStar FC players
Guiseley A.F.C. players
English Football League players
English sportspeople of Saint Kitts and Nevis descent
Association football wingers
Halifax Town A.F.C. non-playing staff
Manchester City F.C. non-playing staff
FC Halifax Town non-playing staff
Bradford City A.F.C. non-playing staff
Leeds United F.C. non-playing staff
Bradford (Park Avenue) A.F.C. non-playing staff